Tvedestrand og Omegns Avis was a Norwegian newspaper, published in Tvedestrand in Aust-Agder county.

Tvedestrand og Omegns Avis was started in 1902. It stopped in 1940, but returned in 1945. It finally went defunct in 1948.

References

1902 establishments in Norway
1948 disestablishments in Norway
Mass media in Aust-Agder
Defunct newspapers published in Norway
Newspapers published in Norway
Norwegian-language newspapers
Publications established in 1902
Publications disestablished in 1940
Newspapers established in 1945
Publications disestablished in 1948